Autauga County is a county located in the central portion of the U.S. state of Alabama. As of the 2020 census the population was 58,805. Its county seat is Prattville.

Autauga County is part of the Montgomery metropolitan area.

History
Autauga County was established on November 21, 1818, by an act of the Alabama Territorial Legislature (one year before Alabama was admitted as a State). As established, the county included present-day Autauga County, as well as Elmore County and Chilton County. At the time, Autauga (aka, Tawasa) Indians lived here. They were concentrated in a village named Atagi (meaning "pure water") situated on the banks of a creek by the same name (called "Pearl Water Creek" by settlers); it is a tributary of the Alabama River. 

The Autauga were a band of the Alibamu tribe, and named after their geographic location. The Alibamu eventually became absorbed within the Creek Confederacy. During Andrew Jackson's invasion of the area during the Creek War, as part of the War of 1812, the Autaga sent many warriors to resist. This county was part of the territory ceded in 1814 by the Creek Confederacy in the Treaty of Fort Jackson.

The territorial legislature designated the first county seat was designated at Jackson's Mill, but the court met there briefly, choosing to select a permanent seat at Washington. The new county seat was built on the former site of Atagi village in the southeast corner of the county. With population growth in the west, in 1830, the county seat was moved to a more central location at Kingston. Losing business and residents to the new county seat, the town of Washington dwindled until it was completely deserted by the late 1830s.

Daniel Pratt arrived in Autauga County in 1833 and founded the new town of Prattville, north of Atagi on the fall line of Autauga Creek. His cotton gin factory quickly became the largest manufacturer of gins in the world; it was the first major industry in Alabama. 

Pratt financially backed the recruitment at his factory of men for the Prattville Dragoons, a fighting unit for the Confederacy. It was organized in anticipation of the Civil War. Other units formed in Autauga County included the Autauga Rifles (Autaugaville), The John Steele Guards (western Autauga Co.) and the Varina Rifles (northern Autauga Co.). None of the fighting of the Civil War reached Autauga County. Pratt was able to secure payment of debts from Northern accounts soon after the war, lessening the disabling effects of the Reconstruction period in the county.

Immediately after emancipation in early 1863, Charles Atwood, a freedman who had formerly been enslaved by Daniel Pratt, bought a house in the center of Prattville. He became one of the founding investors in Pratt's South and North Railroad. It was exceptional for an African American to become so economically successful and prominent, and to own land in an Alabama city in this period.

In 1866 and 1868, the legislature established Elmore and Chilton counties from Autauga County. The county seat was newly designated as Prattville, which was  the population center of the redefined jurisdiction. A new courthouse was completed there in 1870 by local builder George L. Smith. In 1906, a new and larger courthouse was erected a block north; it was designed in a modified Richardsonian Romanesque style. The building was designed by Bruce Architectural Co. of Birmingham and built by Dobson & Bynum of Montgomery.

Geography
The county is mostly located in the Gulf Coastal Plain region, with a few rolling hills and forests due to its close proximity to the fall line of the eastern United States.

Climate
The county has a prevailing humid subtropical climate dominated by its location in the Southern Plains ecological sub-region of the United States.

Major highways
 Interstate 65
 U.S. Highway 31
 U.S. Highway 82
 State Route 14
 State Route 111
 State Route 143

Adjacent counties
Chilton County - north
Elmore County - east
Montgomery County - southeast
Lowndes County - south
Dallas County - west

Demographics

2020 census

As of the 2020 United States census, there were 58,805 people, 21,397 households, and 15,076 families residing in the county.

2010 census
As of the census of 2010, there were 54,571 people, 20,221 households, and 15,064 families residing in the county. The population density was 91 people per square mile (35/km2). There were 22,135 housing units at an average density of 36 per square mile (14/km2). The racial makeup of the county was 78.5% White, 17.7% Black or African American, 0.4% Native American, 0.9% Asian, 0.1% Pacific Islander, and 1.6% from two or more races.  2.4% of the population were Hispanic or Latino of any race.

There were 20,221 households, out of which 34.9% had children under the age of 18 living with them, 56.2% were married couples living together, 13.7% had a female householder with no husband present, and 25.5% were non-families. 22.0% of all households were made up of individuals, and 8.0% had someone living alone who was 65 years of age or older. The average household size was 2.68, and the average family size was 3.13.

In the county, the population was spread out, with 26.8% under the age of 18, 8.5% from 18 to 24, 27% from 25 to 44, 25.7% from 45 to 64, and 12.0% who were 65 years of age or older. The median age was 37 years. For every 100 females, there were 94.9 males.

The median income for a household in the county was $53,682, and the median income for a family was $66,349. Males had a median income of $49,743 versus $32,592 for females. The per capita income for the county was $24,571. About 8.3% of families and 12.1% of the population were below the poverty line, including 17.5% of those under age 18 and 7.0% of those age 65 or over.

In 2000, the largest denominational groups were Evangelical Protestants (with 18,893 adherents) and Mainline Protestants (with 3,657 adherents). The largest religious bodies were The Southern Baptist Convention (with 14,727 members) and The United Methodist Church (with 3,305 members).

Education 
Autauga County contains one public school district. There are approximately 9,000 students in public K-12 schools in Autauga County.

Districts 
School districts include:

 Autauga County School District

Government
The sheriff of Autauga County is Joe Sedinger (R). The Revenue Commissioner for the county is Kathy Evans (R), the Probate Judge is Kim Kervin (R), the Circuit Clerk is Deb Hill (R), the Circuit Judge is Ben Fuller (R), the District Attorney is Randall Houston (R) and the District Judge is Joy Booth (R). 

The legislature is the county commission which consists of five members all of whom are elected from single member districts. The current Commissioners are:

District 1: Sid Thompson, Republican

District 2: John L. Thrailkill, Republican

District 3: Bill Tatum, Republican

District 4: Jay Thompson, Republican - Chairman

District 5: Larry Stoudemire, Democratic

Like much of the Southern U.S., Autauga County was historically a Democratic stronghold, voting for the party's presidential nominee in every election between 1880 and 1960. However, the county has switched in affiliation to the Republican Party over the past 50 years. The last Democrat to win the county in a presidential election is Jimmy Carter, who won it by a plurality in 1976.

Education
The Autauga County School System is the county's sole public school system.

East Memorial Christian Academy is located in an unincorporated area of the county, near Prattville.

Places of interest
Autauga County is home to several parks, such as Wilderness Park, Cooters Pond Park, Pratt Park, Swift Creek Park, Newton Park, Spinners Park, Heritage Park, and Overlook Memorial Park.

Communities

Cities

 Millbrook
 Prattville
Booth
 Kingston

Towns

 Autaugaville
 Mulberry

 Billingsley
 Evergreen

Census-designated places 

 Marbury
 Pine Level

Unincorporated communities

 Booth
Evergreen
 Jones
 Kingston
 Mulberry

Ghost town
Washington

Notable people
Samuel Smith Harris, (1841-1888), born in Autauga County, Presbyterian clergyman, founder and editor of Living Word magazine, and bishop of the Diocese of Michigan.
William Henry Lanier, (1855-1929), born in Autauga County, was a prominent educator who served as president of Alcorn A. and M. from 1899 to 1905. He also served as superintendent of Yazoo City and Jackson, Mississippi black schools.
Wilson Pickett, (1941-2006), born in Prattville, Alabama, American recording artist best known for singing In the Midnight Hour and Mustang Sally.

In popular culture
Autauga County is the main setting of Rita Williams-Garcia's novel Gone Crazy in Alabama.

See also

National Register of Historic Places listings in Autauga County, Alabama
Properties on the Alabama Register of Landmarks and Heritage in Autauga County, Alabama
List of counties in Alabama

References

External links

Autauga County's Official Website
Alabama Historical Association Markers in Autauga County
Autauga County Genealogical Information at Rootsweb.com
 Autauga County map of roads/towns (map © 2007 Univ. of Alabama).
River Region Tourism Site

 

 
Alabama placenames of Native American origin
Montgomery metropolitan area
1818 establishments in Alabama Territory
Populated places established in 1818